The Super is a 1991 American comedy film directed by Rod Daniel and starring Joe Pesci as a New York City slum landlord sentenced to live in one of his own buildings until it is brought up to code. Screenwriter Nora Ephron co-scripted the story with Sam Simon. The Super is the last film in which Vincent Gardenia appeared.

Plot
Louie Kritski is a heartless slumlord who was born into money, thanks to his ruthless father, "Big Lou" (Vincent Gardenia), also a slumlord. However, the tables turn on Louie when he's threatened with prison for his failure to keep his New York City slum up to code. The judge gives him another option, which he accepts: he must live in a vacant apartment of one of his own shoddy run-down apartment blocks until he brings it up to livable standards.

The sentence is an effective house arrest; Louie is not allowed to leave the apartment except for routine exercise, grocery shopping, medical emergencies and business relating to building repairs. In addition, Louie is not authorized to make any changes to the apartment he has been assigned unless all other apartments had the same upgrade beforehand. At first Louie is adamant that not one repair will be carried out, and will wait until his father bails him out. However, Louie has a change of heart after meeting and getting to know the building's residents, including a small-time hustler named Marlon (Ruben Blades), and a struggling street boy named Tito (Kenny Blank).

Over time, Louie grows more sympathetic with their problems and makes amends for his greediness through actions such as donating space heaters to the tenants to help them cope with the winter. Unfortunately, Big Lou Kritski is the owner of the property in title, and he resists his son's entreaties to spend money to improve the tenements. When Louie confronts Big Lou who is about to set fire to his own tenement, all the residents appear on the roof to back up Louie. The film ends with Louie's building completely refurbished, Marlon becoming the new super, and all the tenants gathered outside to see Louie off with a gift: his Corvette—which had been completely stripped of its parts shortly after he first arrived—fully restored. A grateful Louie drives away as a large man appears and angrily demands to know who stole his car; all the tenants point in the direction in which Louie drove off in.

Cast
 Joe Pesci as Louie Kritski Jr.
 Daniel Baltzman as Young Louie Jr.
 Vincent Gardenia as Lou "Big Lou" Kritski Sr.
 Ruben Blades as Marlon
 Madolyn Smith as Naomi Bensinger 
 Stacey Travis as Heather
 Carole Shelley as Irene Kritski
 Kenny Blank as Tito
 Steven Rodriguez as Pedro
 Beatrice Winde as Leotha
 Eileen Galindo as Linda Diaz
 Pete Cody as Pete "Fantastic Pete", In 2A

According to Rod Daniel, Chevy Chase was originally considered for the lead role.

Reception
The Super had a $22 million production budget. The film was a box-office failure, only grossing $11,000,863 domestically in its release. It was also widely panned by critics in its theatrical release. On Rotten Tomatoes it has an approval rating of 0% based on nine reviews. Audiences surveyed by CinemaScore gave the film a grade of "B−" on scale of A+ to F.

Roger Ebert gave the film 2 out of 4.

Kenny Blank, who played Tito, was nominated for a Young Artist Award in 1992 in the category 'Best Young Actor Co-starring in a Motion Picture'.

References

External links
 
 

1991 films
American comedy films
1991 comedy films
Films directed by Rod Daniel
Films set in New York City
Films shot in New York City
Largo Entertainment films
Hood comedy films
Films about landlords
Films scored by Miles Goodman
1990s English-language films
1990s American films